Keewaydin Canoe Camp is a Canadian summer camp.

Notable campers
 Michael Eisner
 Charles O'Neill
 John McPhee
 Grey Owl (Wilderness Guide)
 Micah Diamond (son of Neil Diamond)

References

External links
Keewaydin Temagami
Keewaydin Foundation
The Keewaydin Way @ Ottertooth.com

Summer camps in Canada
Allagash River
Localities of Temagami
Buildings and structures in Nipissing District